John Henry Davis (born 10 November 1954 in Oxford, England) is a former international motorcycle speedway rider who represented England when they won the World Team Cup in 1977 1980 Speedway World Team Cup Winner,

He was capped for England 68 times, and was the first Englishman to win the prestigious Czech Golden Helmet in Pardubice. He was also the first Englishman to race in the Polish League for Gdansk. He raced for Diedenbergen in the German League for ten seasons, winning four German titles, where he was consistently the top performer. He qualified for 16 consecutive British Final appearances, his best finish being second to the late Kenny Carter; this was when England ruled The Speedway World.

In 1975, after 3 years at Oxford, he was caught up in the wrangle over whether Ole Olsen would ride for Oxford, and was in the strange position of guesting for himself in a couple of matches at the start of the season. Eventually, the Speedway Control Board ruled that Olsen would stay with Wolverhampton Wolves, Dag Lovaas would ride at Oxford, and John could join Reading Racers.

After the end of his speedway career, Davis started a burger business in 1994 which progressed into Event Catering, supplying venues and events all over the south of the country with their Public Catering requirements. Among the contracts they obtained are The Royal Imperial War Museum at Duxford, Newbury Racecourse, Fontwell Racecourse, Bath Racecourse, Chepstow Racecourse, Wincanton Racecourse, The Ageas Bowl (Hampshire Cricket Ground), The PSP Southampton Boat Show, The Norfolk Spectacular Music Festival, Poole Speedway, Bucks Show, Romsey Show, Glastonbury Festival and quite a few Concerts including T4 on the Beach, The British MX GP, Lydden Hill for the Rally Cross events, and Red Bull Moto Cross Series.

World final appearances

Individual World Championship
 1977 -  Gothenburg, Ullevi - Reserve - did not ride
 1980 -  Gothenburg, Ullevi - 6th - 9pts
 1988 -  Vojens, Speedway Center - 12th - 3pts

World Team Cup
 1977 -  Wrocław, Olympic Stadium (with Peter Collins / Malcolm Simmons / Michael Lee / Dave Jessup) - Winner - 37pts (6)
 1981 -  Olching, Speedway Stadion Olching (with Dave Jessup / Chris Morton / Kenny Carter / Gordon Kennett) - 2nd - 29pts (5)
 1985 –  Long Beach, Veterans Memorial Stadium (with Jeremy Doncaster / Phil Collins / Kelvin Tatum / Richard Knight) – 3rd – 13pts (0)

European Grasstrack Championship

Final

 1983 -   Nandlastadt 11pts (8th)

References

External Reference
 http://grasstrackgb.co.uk/john-davis/

1954 births
Living people
British speedway riders
English motorcycle racers
Reading Racers riders
Wimbledon Dons riders
Poole Pirates riders
Sheffield Tigers riders
Oxford Cheetahs riders
Peterborough Panthers riders
Swindon Robins riders
King's Lynn Stars riders
Exeter Falcons riders